Jin Xianglan (born 26 December 1972) is a Chinese judoka. She competed in the women's lightweight event at the 1992 Summer Olympics.

References

1972 births
Living people
Chinese female judoka
Olympic judoka of China
Judoka at the 1992 Summer Olympics
Place of birth missing (living people)
Judoka at the 1990 Asian Games
Asian Games medalists in judo
Asian Games gold medalists for China
Medalists at the 1990 Asian Games
20th-century Chinese women
21st-century Chinese women